The 2006 DFS Classic was a women's tennis tournament played on grass courts at the Edgbaston Priory Club in Birmingham in the United Kingdom that was part of Tier III of the 2006 WTA Tour. It was the 25th edition of the tournament and was held from 12 June until 18 June 2006. Unseeded Vera Zvonareva won the singles title.

Finals

Singles

 Vera Zvonareva defeated  Jamea Jackson 7–6(14–12), 7–6(7–5)
 It was Zvonareva's 2nd title of the year and the 7th of her career.

Doubles

 Jelena Janković /  Li Na defeated  Jill Craybas /  Liezel Huber 6–2, 6–4
 It was Janković's only title of the year and the 2nd of her career. It was Na's only title of the year and the 3rd of her career.

External links
 ITF tournament edition details

DFS Classic
Birmingham Classic (tennis)
DFS Classic
DFS Classic